"Hangover" is a single by South Korean rapper Psy, featuring American rapper Snoop Dogg.  Produced by Yoo Gun-hyung, Its music video debuted on the June 8, 2014 broadcast of Jimmy Kimmel Live!. , the video has received over 345 million views on YouTube. The song serves as a follow-up to Psy's two international hit singles "Gangnam Style" and "Gentleman". The song was used in the 2018 Marvel superhero film Black Panther during the Busan casino scene.

Production 
In January 2014, YG Entertainment confirmed that Psy's upcoming single will feature the American rapper Snoop Dogg, along with K-pop rapper G-Dragon. On March 12, 2014, it was revealed that CL of 2NE1 would also appear in the video.

According to YG Entertainment, the music video was produced in January 2014 during Snoop Dogg's visit to South Korea. In an interview with CNN, Psy revealed that the video was filmed over the course of 18 hours at 10 different locations near Incheon International Airport.

Reception

Critical response 
Time magazine described the music video as "delightful", while Spin magazine compared the music to "cacophonous EDM-rap" that is "unlikely to ease a hangover", but the end result is "still a curiously enjoyable five minutes".

Social media 
Immediately after its release, reactions on social media were mixed. The Wall Street Journal noted that some viewers were "soaking it up", while others have voiced their "complaints about both the song and the video". In South Korea, some fans described the music video as a wrong depiction of Korean culture. Within 24 hours of release, the music video for "Hangover" racked up over 10 million views.

Charts

Weekly charts

Year-end charts

References

External links

2014 songs
2014 singles
Korean-language songs
Macaronic songs
Psy songs
Songs about alcohol
South Korean songs
2014 YouTube videos
Songs written by Snoop Dogg
Songs written by Psy
Electro songs
Hip hop songs